Solomon ben David  may refer to:
Solomon, Solomon ben David, son of King David who succeeded his father as King of Israel and founded the line of the Kings of Judah, 10th century BCE
 Solomon (Karaite prince), Karaite leader of the late tenth and early eleventh centuries CE, son of David ben Boaz